Volo can refer to:

Places
Volo, Illinois, a village in the United States
Volo Auto Museum
Volos, Greek city
Çatalada (Volo)

Music
Volo (duo), French duo made up of Frédéric and Olivier Volovitch 
Il Volo, Italian operatic pop trio
Volo, an album by the Italian progressive rock band Goblin

Others
Volo (Company), a British retail technology business.
, a merchant vessel launched in 1938 and sunk in 1941
Volo (barque), a merchant vessel built in the 1880s and wrecked in 1886
Volothamp Geddarm, a fictional historian and travel writer from the world of Forgotten Realms created by Ed Greenwood
Volo, a character from Pokémon Legends: Arceus.
bocce volo, a boules game, a variation on the game of bocce

See also 
 Valo (disambiguation)
 Vola (disambiguation)